İsmet Uluğ (1901 – 27 August 1975) was a Turkish boxer and football player of rivals Galatasaray and Fenerbahçe. Born in İstanbul, he played as a midfielder and winger and was nicknamed Yavuz İsmet.

He played for Fenerbahçe between 1919–28 and also captained the team. He was also the president of Fenerbahçe between 1962-66. He won the 1920–21, 1922-23 Istanbul League Championships as a player. He won the 1963–64 and 1964-65 Turkish League Championships as a president. He was included in the General Harington Cup squad.

He was included in the first squad of the Turkey national football team that played against Romania on 26 October 1923. He played 11 times for the national team. He was included in the national squads for the 1924 Summer Olympics and the 1928 Summer Olympics.

References

External links

1901 births
1975 deaths
Footballers from Istanbul
Turkish footballers
Turkey international footballers
Association football defenders
Galatasaray S.K. footballers
Fenerbahçe S.K. footballers
Olympic footballers of Turkey
Footballers at the 1924 Summer Olympics
Footballers at the 1928 Summer Olympics
Fenerbahçe S.K. presidents
Turkish male boxers